Desert of Fire is a 1997 TV miniseries directed by Enzo G. Castellari. It is a European co-production between Italy (where the miniseries was broadcast with the title Deserto di fuoco), Germany (where it is known as Prinzessin Amina - Das Geheimnis der Liebe) and France (where its title is Le désert de feu).

Plot

Cast 
 Anthony Delon	as 	René / Ben
 Mandala Tayde	as 	Amina
 Stéphane Freiss	as 	Jacquot
 Arielle Dombasle	as	Magda
 Virna Lisi	as	Christine Duvivier
 Claudia Cardinale	as	Leila
 Vittorio Gassman	as	Tarek
 Marie Laforêt	as 	Rama
 Fabio Testi	as	Diderot
 Giuliano Gemma	as	Tafud
 Franco Nero	as 	Marcel Duvivier
Mathieu Carrière	as 	François Legrand
 Jean Sorel	as 	Miller
 Christopher Buchholz	as 	Dubai
 Orso Maria Guerrini	as 	Alkan
 Luca Lionello	as 	Selim
 Hans Peter Hallwachs	as 	Jafar

References

External links

1997 television films
1997 films
Films directed by Enzo G. Castellari